The Law Society of Zimbabwe (LSZ) is the law society responsible for representing and regulating how lawyers and law firms operate in Zimbabwe. It is mandated to observe of the rule of law in the justice system.

The Law Society of Zimbabwe was established in 1981. Its membership is drawn from all registered legal practitioners in Zimbabwe in private practice, commerce and civil service.

Functions of the Law Society

Regulate the solicitors' profession in respect of continuing training, discipline and trust accounts
Promote justice, defend human rights, rule of law and the independence of the judiciary system
To contribute, undertake or make recommendations on legal training
Represent the solicitors' profession and articulate its views on various issues
Control of admission of new members to the solicitors' profession
To curb corruption in the legal system

Anti-corruption activities

The LSZ plays an active role against corruption and the organisation participated in building the capacity of the Zimbabwe Anti-Corruption Commission on the legal aspects of investigating corruption in the Zimbabwe justice sector. The society also committed to capacitating registered lawyers and law firms in the area  of anti-corruption, anti-bribery, fraud and asset tracing.

Law Society of Zimbabwe also partnered with Judicial Services Commission of Zimbabwe, Messenger of Court and Sheriff's Office to form Against Corruption Together (ACT), an initiative created to fight against corruption in the justice delivery system.

Structure

Law Society of Zimbabwe elect representatives to sit on the Society's Council, the governing body. The Society's president and the vice president hold office for two years. The current president is Wellington Magaya who was installed on 1 February 2021 and Rumbidzai Matambo is the vice president.

Immediate past presidents

Thandazani Masiye-Moyo 2019 
Misheck Hogwe 2017 
Vimbai Nyemba (first female president) 2015 
Lloyd Mhishi 2013 
Tinoziva Bere 2011 
Josphat Tshuma 2009 
Joseph James 2005
 Sternford Moyo

References 

Law societies
Bar associations